Kingsway Camp, officially Guru Teg Bahadur Nagar (GTB Nagar) since 1970, is a historic area located in North West Delhi, near Civil Lines and Delhi University. It starts from Guru Teg Bahadur Nagar (GTB) intersection, and has residential areas like Hudson Lines and Outram Lines. Neighboring localities include Dhaka Village, Mukherjee Nagar and Hakikat Nagar. The foundation of the new capital of British India, New Delhi, was laid at Coronation Park by King George V in December, 1911, making this area historically significant.

Originally named after Kingsway an avenue which was built as a precursor to the construction of the residence of the Viceroy of India, after the Delhi Durbar of 1911, though its location was finally shifted to the Raisina Hill, its present location, as was the road titled Kingsway, now known as Rajpath. The area stretched over twenty-five square miles from banks of Yamuna River in the east to Shalimar Bagh in the west. Post independence in 1947, it became the venue of the largest refugee camp in Delhi, housing 3,00,000 refugees. Today, it is a posh residential locality, with a large number of students residing in the area owing to its proximity to the Delhi University; it is serviced by the GTB Nagar underground station of Delhi Metro yellow line and also serving the nearby areas of Mukherji Nagar, Nirankari Colony, Vijay Nagar, etc.

History

During the British Raj, it acquired the historic importance due to the presence of the "Coronation Park" close by, now close to the Nirankari Colony, where all the three Delhi Durbar took place, and is now host the Coronation Memorial. Though the most important event took place on 12 December 1911, when George V, the then Emperor of India along with Queen Mary, during the Delhi Durbar, made the announcement that the capital of the Raj was to be shifted from Calcutta to Delhi, subsequently on  15 December 1911, they laid the foundation stone for Viceroy's residence, and New Delhi here, which was subsequently shifted to its present location on Raisina Hill near Rashtrapati Bhavan (President's House). The newly appointed emperors of the British Raj were stationed at Kingsway Camp. Since the Kings had to pass through this route, it was named "Kingsway Camp", meaning the "Way Of the King".

In the 1910s, a steam generation power plant was established here by the government, which was later shifted to Raj Ghat area around 1931, when the capital of India was shifted to New Delhi, and known as Central Power House.

The Harijan Sevak Sangh for Dalits (untouchables) was established here, by Mahatma Gandhi on 24 September 1932. Later, it was Valmiki Bhawan within the campus, which functioned as Gandhi ji's one-room ashram. Today, the  campus includes the Gandhi Ashram, Harijan Basti, Lala Hans Raj Gupta Industrial Training Institute and also has a residential school for boys and girls.

However, until the independence of India, much of area was still filled with fruit gardens, or remained a wilderness and swamp, due to its low-lying location, which tended to flood during the rainy season though a big change was yet to come. As with India's independence in 1947, Kingway Camp became the venue for one of many refugee camps set up in Delhi. Here some 3,00,000 people displaced from what was now Pakistan, due to partition of India stayed, making it the largest such camp. Here tents and temporary barracks became home for the people in the coming months. Though almost two years after it was built, in May 1949 over 42,000 refugees were still living at the camp as the construction of rehabilitation colonies and houses in the area was still underway, that is when the inhabitants of the camp went on a hunger strike. Gandhian Lakshmi Chand Jain  was in-charge of working of the camp, which was close to the Gandhi ashram, where Gandhiji held his prayer meetings. Kamaladevi Chattopadhyay also worked extensively at the camp, with women groups and also worked towards forming cooperatives here. Over the next few years a lot of refugees settled in the nearby area itself, many moved to West Delhi residential areas, and some newly built refugee townships. Though unlike other refugee townships like Nilokheri, Faridabad and Rajpura, there was no attempt to bring residential and economic activity in proximity to one another, nevertheless owing to its proximity with Delhi University the area flourished in the coming years.

The Oznam Home, a noted old-age home was established here, by St. Vincent de Paul Society in 1958, and was run by an Austrian nun, Sister Edith who stayed for the next 30 years. Kingsway Camp was official renamed as Guru Teg Bahadur Nagar on  12 December 1970 by Municipal Corporation of Delhi. All India Radio's first external service shortwave facility was also established here.

Transport
The place is well connected with all the major places such as Mukherjee Nagar with 24x7 public as well as private transport. With DTC Services, the Delhi Metro has also started functioning in this part of North Delhi. Ring road passes through the place. The place also has an intercity bus stand namely BBM Depot, through which direct and convenient public transport is available throughout Delhi.

Literature

External links

 Kingsway-Camp wikimapia

References

Neighbourhoods in Delhi
North Delhi district